Pedro Rosso Leal is the ambassador of Cuba to Angola.

See also
Angola-Cuba relations

References

Cuban diplomats
Ambassadors of Cuba to Angola
Year of birth missing (living people)
Living people
Place of birth missing (living people)
21st-century Cuban politicians